There have been six baronetcies created for persons with the surname Wright, three in the Baronetage of England, two in the Baronetage of Great Britain and one in the Baronetage of the United Kingdom. All creations are extinct.

Wright baronets, of Dennington (1646)
The Wright Baronetcy, of Dennington in the County of Suffolk, was created in the Baronetage of England on 7 February 1646 for Benjamin Wright. The title became extinct on his death in circa 1670.
Sir Benjamin Wright, 1st Baronet (died )

Wright baronets, of Dagenham (1660)

The Wright Baronetcy, of Dagenham in the County of Essex, was created in the Baronetage of England on 11 June 1660 for Henry Wright, Member of Parliament for Harwich. The title became extinct on the early death of the second Baronet in 1681.
Sir Henry Wright, 1st Baronet (–1664)
Sir Henry Wright, 2nd Baronet (1662–1681)

Wright baronets, of Cranham Hall (1661)
The Wright Baronetcy, of Cranham Hall in the County of Essex, was created in the Baronetage of England on 15 February 1661 for Benjamin Wright. The title became extinct on the death of the fourth Baronet in 1738.
Sir Benjamin Wright, 1st Baronet (died 1706)
Sir Nathan Wright, 2nd Baronet (1661–1727)
Sir Nathan Wright, 3rd Baronet (1684–1737)
Sir Samuel Wright, 4th Baronet (died 1738)

Wright baronets, of Venice (1772)

The Wright Baronetcy, of Venice, was created in the Baronetage of Great Britain on 12 October 1772 for James Wright. The title became extinct on the death of the second Baronet in circa 1812.
Sir James Wright, 1st Baronet (died 1803)
Sir George Wright, 2nd Baronet (died c. 1812)

Wright baronets, of Carolside (1772)
The Wright Baronetcy, of Carolside in the County of Berwick, was created in the Baronetage of Great Britain on 8 December 1772 for James Wright. The title is presumed to have become extinct on the death of the third Baronet in 1837.
Sir James Wright, 1st Baronet (c. 1715–1786)
Sir James Wright, 2nd Baronet (c. 1747–1816)
Sir James Alexander Wright, 3rd Baronet (1799–1837)

Wright baronets, of Swansea (1920)
The Wright Baronetcy, of Swansea in the County of Glamorgan, was created in the Baronetage of the United Kingdom on 27 January 1920 for the steel manufacturer John Wright. The title became extinct on the death of the second Baronet in 1950.
Sir John Roper Wright, 1st Baronet (1843–1926)
Sir William Charles Wright, 2nd Baronet, GBE (1876–1950)

References

Extinct baronetcies in the Baronetage of England
Extinct baronetcies in the Baronetage of Great Britain
Extinct baronetcies in the Baronetage of the United Kingdom
1646 establishments in England